Silver Canyon is a 1951 American Western film directed by John English and written by Gerald Geraghty. The film stars Gene Autry, Gail Davis, Jim Davis, Bob Steele, Edgar Dearing and Richard Alexander. The film was released on June 20, 1951, by Columbia Pictures.

Plot

Cast
Gene Autry as Gene Autry
Gail Davis as Dell Middler
Jim Davis as Wade McQuarrie
Bob Steele as Walt Middler
Edgar Dearing as Colonel Middler
Richard Alexander as Luke Anders
Terry Frost as Irv Wyatt
Peter Mamakos as Laughing Jack
Pat Buttram as Pat Claggett
Champion as Gene's Horse

References

External links
 

1951 films
American Western (genre) films
1951 Western (genre) films
Columbia Pictures films
Films directed by John English
American black-and-white films
1950s English-language films
1950s American films